Lazec is a village above the right bank of the Idrijca River in the Municipality of Cerkno in the traditional Littoral region of Slovenia.

The local church is dedicated to Saint George and belongs to the Parish of Otalež.

References

External links
Lazec on Geopedia

Populated places in the Municipality of Cerkno